Makal ( Daughter) is a 2022 Indian Malayalam-language family drama film directed by Sathyan Anthikkad and written by Iqbal Kuttippuram. The film stars Jayaram, Meera Jasmine, Devika Sanjay, Sreenivasan, Innocent, and Naslen K. Gafoor. The film is produced by Central Pictures, the company that previously produced Anthikad's  Kudumbapuranam, Kalikkalam and Oru Indian Pranayakatha. This marks Meera Jasmine's comeback film after a six-year hiatus and also her 25th Malayalam film. The film also marks Jayaram's return to mollywood after a 3 year gap

Premise
Mother and daughter duo Juliet and Aparna have been living together for the best part of their lives, enjoying their freedom and level of understanding. After Aparna's father Nandan returns from the Gulf and Juliet gets a government job in another district, Nandan has to figure out being a father to his daughter. While the generation gap leads to a series of misunderstandings and squabbles, the entry of an unexpected stranger in their lives changes the father and daughter dynamics, and the stranger's presence become a reason for them to connect meaningfully.

Cast

Production
Movie filming commenced in October 2021 in Kerala, with Jayaram joining the sets on October 21. On December 12, actor Jayaram informed via a tweet that he is in the final leg of filming. The shoot was wrapped in late-December.

Music
The film score is composed, orchestrated and produced by Rahul Raj, while the songs featured in the film are composed by Vishnu Vijay.

Release

Theatrical
The film was released in theatres on 29 April 2022.

Home media
The digital rights of the film were acquired by ManoramaMAX. The satellite rights of the film are owned by Mazhavil Manorama.

Reception
The film received mixed to positive reviews, praising the performances, direction and humour but criticised its plot, writing and climax.

References 

2022 films
Films directed by Sathyan Anthikad
Indian comedy-drama films
Indian family films
Films set in Kerala
Films shot in Thrissur
2022 drama films